is the fifth single by Japanese entertainer Akina Nakamori. Written by Etsuko Kisugi and Takao Kisugi, the single was released on June 1, 1983, by Warner Pioneer through the Reprise label. It was also the second single from her first greatest hits album Best Akina Memoires.

The single peaked at No. 2 on Oricon's weekly singles chart and sold over 429,600 copies.

Track listing 
All music is arranged by Mitsuo Hagita.

Charts

References

External links 
 
 
 

1983 singles
1983 songs
Akina Nakamori songs
Japanese-language songs
Warner Music Japan singles
Reprise Records singles